Castrojimeno is a municipality located in the province of Segovia, Castile and León, Spain. According to the 2004 census (INE), the municipality has a population of 38 inhabitants. it's one of the most important geosites in Segovia

References

Municipalities in the Province of Segovia